The El Gallo Formation is a geological formation in Mexico whose strata date back to the Late Cretaceous, Campanian epoch, specifically dated to 75.21 ± 0.07 Ma and 74.55 ± 0.09 Ma. Dinosaur remains are among the fossils that have been recovered from the formation.

Vertebrate paleofauna

Crurotarsans

Dinosaurs 
Indeterminate theropod, coelurosaur, dromaeosaurid, tyrannosaurid, hadrosaurid, and ankylosaurid remains are known from the formation. Dinosaur eggs are known from the formation. Alexornis antecedens actually comes from the La Bocana Roja Formation. An indeterminate hadrosaurine is known from the formation.

Lepidosaurs

Mammals

Amphibians 
An indeterminate albanerpetontid is known from the formation.

See also 
 List of dinosaur-bearing rock formations
 List of fossiliferous stratigraphic units in Mexico

References

Bibliography 

 Sullivan, R.M., and Lucas, S.G. 2006. "The Kirtlandian land-vertebrate "age" – faunal composition, temporal position and biostratigraphic correlation in the nonmarine Upper Cretaceous of western North America." New Mexico Museum of Natural History and Science, Bulletin 35:7-29
  
 Hilton, Richard P. 2003. Dinosaurs and Other Mesozoic Reptiles of California. Berkeley: University of California Press. 318 pp.

Further reading 

 M. L. Chavarria-Arellano, T. R. Simões, and M. Montellano-Ballesteros. 2018. New data on the Late Cretaceous lizard Dicothodon bajaensis (Squamata, Borioteiioidea) from Baja California, Mexico reveals an unusual tooth replacement pattern in squamates. Anais da Academia Brasileira de Ciências
 O. A. López Conde, J. Sterli, M. L. Chavarría Arellano, D. B. Brinkman, and M. Montellano Ballesteros. 2018. Turtles from the Late Cretaceous (Campanian) of El Gallo Formation, Baja California, Mexico. South American Journal of Earth Sciences 88:693-699
 B. R. Peecook, J. A. Wilson, R. Hernandez-Rivera, M. Montellano-Ballesteros, and G. P. Wilson. 2014. First tyrannosaurid remains from the Upper Cretaceous "El Gallo" Formation of Baja California, Mexico. Acta Palaeontologica Polonica 59(1):71-80
 A. A. Ramírez Velasco, R. Hernández Rivera, and R. Servin Pichardo. 2014. The hadrosaurian record from Mexico. In D. A. Eberth & D. C. Evans (ed.), Hadrosaurs 340-360
 H. E. Rivera Sylva, K. Carpenter, and F. J. Aranda Manteca. 2011. Late Cretaceous nodosaurids (Ankylosauria: Ornithischia) from Mexico. Revista Mexicana de Ciencias Geológicas 28(3):371-378
 W. J. Morris. 1973. Mesozoic and Tertiary vertebrates in Baja California. National Geographic Society Research Reports (1966) 7:197-209
 A. Silva Bárcenas. 1969. Localidades de vertebrados fósiles en la Republica Méxicana [Vertebrate fossil localities in the Mexican Republic]. Universidad Nacional Autónoma de México, Instituto de Geología, Paleontología Mexicana 28:1-34
 W. Langston and M. H. Oakes. 1954. Hadrosaurs in Baja California. Bulletin of the Geological Society of America 65(12):1344

Geologic formations of Mexico
Upper Cretaceous Series of North America
Cretaceous Mexico
Campanian Stage
Mudstone formations
Sandstone formations
Fluvial deposits
Tidal deposits
Ooliferous formations
Fossiliferous stratigraphic units of North America
Paleontology in Mexico
Formations